Fabrice Santoro was the defending champion, and won in the final 6–3, 7–5, against Prakash Amritraj.

Seeds
The top four seeds receive a bye into the second round.

Draw

Finals

Top half

Bottom half

External links
 Draw
 Qualifying draw

Singles